Anatoli Kirilov (died 21 May 2009) was a Bulgarian professional football player and manager. Kirilov, who was manager of Spartak Varna at the time, died on 21 May 2009 in a car accident, at the age of 42.

References

2009 deaths
Road incident deaths in Bulgaria
Bulgarian footballers
Bulgarian football managers
PFC Spartak Pleven players
PFC Spartak Varna managers
Year of birth missing
Association footballers not categorized by position
People from Svishtov
Sportspeople from Veliko Tarnovo Province